A (proper) Riordan array is an infinite lower triangular matrix, constructed out of two formal power series,  of order 0 and  of order 1, in such a way that . 
     
A Riordan array is an element of the Riordan group. It was created by mathematician Louis W. Shapiro and named after mathematician John Riordan.

The study of Riordan arrays is a growing field that is both being influenced by, and continuing its contributions to, other fields such as combinatorics, group theory, matrix theory, number theory, probability, sequences and series, Lie groups and Lie algebras, orthogonal polynomials, graph theory, networks, Beal conjecture, Riemann hypothesis, unimodal sequences, combinatorial identities, elliptic curves, numerical approximation, asymptotics, and data analysis. Riordan arrays is also a powerful unifying concept, binding together important tools: generating functions, computer algebra systems, formal languages, path model, and so on.

Details follow.  
    
  
So column  of the array simply consists of the sequence of coefficients of the power series  in particular column 0 determines and is determined by the power series  As  is of order 0, it has a multiplicative inverse and it follows that from the array's column 1 we can recover  as    Since  has order 1,  has order  and so has   It follows that the array   is infinite triangular exhibiting  a geometric progression    on its main diagonal. It also follows that  the map associating to a pair of power series   its triangular array is injective.  
 
An example for a Riordan array is given by the pair of power series    It is not difficult to show that this  pair generates the infinite triangular array of binomial coefficients   also called Pascal matrix

   
   
Proof.  If   is a power series with associated  coefficient sequence   then, by Cauchy multiplication of power series, 
  So the latter series has as coefficient sequence    and hence
 Fix any  If   so that  represents   column    of the Pascal array, then   This argument allows to see by induction on  that  has  column   of the Pascal array as coefficient sequence. 

 
 
We are going to prove some much used  facts about Riordan arrays. Note that the matrix multiplication rules applied to infinite triangular matrices lead to finite sums only and the product of two   infinite triangular matrices is infinite triangular. The next two theorems were discovered essentially by Shapiro and coworkers, who say they modified work they found in papers by Gian-Carlo Rota and the book of Roman 

 Theorem. a.  Let  and  be Riordan arrays, viewed as infinite lower triangular matrices.  Then the product of these matrices is the  array  associated to the pair      of formal power series which itself is a Riordan array.

b. This fact justifies to define a multiplication `'  of Riordan arrays viewn as pairs of power series by  

Proof. Since  have order 0 it is clear that  has order 0. Similarly   implies  
So  is a Riordan array. 
Define a matrix  as the Riordan array  By definitions  its -th column  is the sequence of coefficients of  
We multiplied a Riordan array  with  a single power series. Let now  be another Riordan array viewn as a matrix. One can form the product  The -th column of this product is just   multiplied with the -th column of  Since the latter corresponds to  the power series 
  it follows by above, that the -th column of  corresponds to    As this holds for all column indices  occurring in   we have shown   part a. Part b is now clear.  
 
 Theorem.  The family of Riordan arrays endowed with the product      '' defined above forms a group: the Riordan group.     
  
Proof. The associativity of the multiplication  `' follows from associativity of matrix multiplication.  Next note   So  is a left neutral element.   Finally  we claim that    is the left inverse to the power series     For this check  the computation    As is well known, an associative structure in which a left neutral element exists and for each element a left inverse is a group.   
  
Of course not all invertible infinite lower triangular arrays are Riordan arrays. Here is a useful characterization for the arrays that are  Riordan. The following result seems  to be due to Rogers 

 Theorem. An infinite lower triangular array  is a Riordan array if and only if there exist a  sequence traditionally called the -sequence,  such that

  
Proof.    Let  be the Riordan array stemming from   Since   Since  has order 1, it follows that  is a Riordan array and by the group property there exists a Riordan array  such that   Computing the  left hand side yields   and so comparison yields  Of course  is a solution to this equation; it is unique because  is composition invertible. So we can rewrite the equation as 
  
Now from the matrix multiplication law, the -entry of the left hand side of this latter equation  is 
  

     
At the other hand the -entry of the rhs of the equation above is 

so that i results.  From  we also get    for all  and since we know that the diagonal elements are nonzero, we have  
Note that using  equation   one can compute all entries knowing the entries   
    
Since  (or the sequence of its coefficients) determines the other entries we find that the array we started with is the array we deduced.

Clearly the  -sequence alone does not deliver all the information about a Riordan array.   Besides the -sequence 
it is the -sequence that has shown to be surprisingly useful.

 Theorem.  Let  be an infinite lower triangular array whose diagonal sequence   does not contain zeros.
Then there exists a unique sequence      such that 

Proof. In general if  are known already then   allows to compute  uniquely. 

Very recently there appeared the book which should be a valuable source for further information.

References

Combinatorics